Odegal basadi or Vadegal basadi is the largest basadi located on the Vindhyagiri Hill in Shravanabelagola in the Indian state of Karnataka.

About temple 
Odegal basadi is a granite temple built in 14th century and is the largest temple on the Vindhyagiri Hill. The temple derives its name from 'Odega', i.e., soapstone used for strengthening the walls of the temple. The temple has three cells facing different directions, giving the name Trirukta Basadi or trikuta Basadi. The temple has splended structure with non-ornate exterior. The temple houses image of Rishabhanatha, Neminatha and Shantinatha made out of dark coloured schist. This temple is include in Adarsh Smarak Scheme introduced by Archaeological Survey of India for the preservation.

The Gommateshwara statue, Siddhara basti, Chennanna basti, and Chauvisa Tirthankara basti are the important temple near Odegal basadi.

Archaeological Survey of India has listed the Odegal basadi in group of monuments in Shravanabelagola as Adarsh Smarak Monument.

Gallery

See also 
 Bhandara Basadi
 Chandragiri hill
 Chandragupta Basadi
 Chavundaraya Basadi

References

Citations

Sources

External links 
 

Jain temples in Karnataka
14th-century Jain temples
Hassan district